Syzygium salicifolium is a species of the genus Syzygium of the flowering plant family Myrtaceae, commonly called "Vellamanchi" in Malayalam. It is commonly seen in evergreen forests. It is endemic to Western Ghats.

Description 
Syzygium salicifolium is a small tree, up to 6 m tall. Its flowering and fruiting season is from April to May, and its flowers are white.

Gallery

References

External links 

salicifolium
Plants described in 1839